Van the man may refer to:

Van Johnson, MGM actor, title of article "Van, the Man," Movieland 14 (August 1956)
Van Morrison, a singer and songwriter from Belfast, title of "Van the Man" bootleg album
Ruud van Nistelrooy, a retired Dutch footballer who played for Manchester United and Real Madrid
National Lampoon's Van Wilder, a movie starring Ryan Reynolds, Kal Penn and Tara Reid
Robin van Persie, a football player for Manchester United and the Netherlands